Putao is a town of Gaochang District, Turpan, Xinjiang, China. , it has three residential communities and five villages under its administration.

References

Township-level divisions of Xinjiang
Turpan